Qerkh Bolagh (also Romanized as Qerkh Bolāgh; also known as Farrokh Bolāgh, Gharakh Bolagh, and Kirkh Bulāqh) is a village in Sardaran Rural District, in the Central District of Kabudarahang County, Hamadan Province, Iran. At the 2006 census, its population was 524, in 138 families.

References 

Populated places in Kabudarahang County